Limnaecia lunacrescens is a moth of the family Cosmopterigidae. It was described by Thomas Pennington Lucas in 1901 and is from Australia.

References

Limnaecia
Moths described in 1901
Moths of Australia